81 (eighty-one) is the natural number following 80 and preceding 82.

In mathematics
81 is:

 the square of 9 and the fourth power of 3.
 a perfect totient number like all powers of three.
 a heptagonal number.
 a centered octagonal number.
 a tribonacci number.
 an open meandric number.
 the ninth member of the Mian-Chowla sequence.
 a palindromic number in bases 8 (1218) and 26 (3326).
 a Harshad number in bases 2, 3, 4, 7, 9, 10 and 13.
 one of three non-trivial numbers (the other two are 1458 and 1729) which, when its digits (in decimal) are added together, produces a sum which, when multiplied by its reversed self, yields the original number:
 8 + 1 = 9
 9 × 9 = 81  (although this case is somewhat degenerate, as the sum has only a single digit).

The inverse of 81 is 0. recurring, missing only the digit "8" from the complete set of digits.  This is an example of the general rule that, in base b,

omitting only the digit b−2.

In astronomy
Messier object M81, a magnitude 8.5 spiral galaxy in the constellation Ursa Major, also known as Bode's Galaxy, and the first of what is known as the M81 Group of galaxies
The New General Catalogue object NGC 81, a spiral galaxy in the constellation Andromeda

In other fields
Eighty-one is also:
The number of squares on a shogi playing board
The year AD 81, 81 BC, or 1981.
The atomic number of thallium
The symbolic number of the Hells Angels Motorcycle Club. 'H' and 'A' are the 8th and 1st letter of the alphabet, respectively.
The title of a short film by Stephen Burke: 81
The model number of Sinclair ZX81
The number of the department in France called Tarn 
The code for international direct dial phone calls to Japan
"+81" is a song by Japanese metalcore band Crystal Lake.
One of two ISBN Group Identifiers for books published in India
The number of stanzas or chapters in the Tao Te Ching (in the most common arrangements).
The number of provinces in Turkey.
The number of prayers said in the Rosary in each night.
"The 81" is a 1965 song by Candy and the Kisses.
Artemis 81 is a 1981 BBC TV science fiction drama.
'The Eighty-One Brothers' is a Japanese fable
The number of possible divinations in the Taixuanjing

In culture
The Arabic characters for the numerals 8 and 1 are visible in the left palm of the human hand.
In China, 81 always reminds people People's Liberation Army as it was founded on August 1.
81 is used to refer to the Hells Angels Motorcycle Club,  since H and A are, respectively, the 8th and 1st letters of the alphabet.

See also 
 List of highways numbered 81

References 

Integers